Aleksandr Aleksandrovich Bagayev (born 17 April 1985) is a former Russian professional footballer.

Club career
He played two seasons in the Russian Football National League for FC Dynamo-SPb St. Petersburg, FC SKA-Energiya Khabarovsk and FC Irtysh Omsk.

External links
 
 

1985 births
Living people
Russian footballers
Association football forwards
FC Dynamo Saint Petersburg players
FC Salyut Belgorod players
Kuopion Palloseura players
AC Oulu players
Kemi City F.C. players
FC Taraz players
FC SKA-Khabarovsk players
FC Irtysh Omsk players
Ykkönen players
Kakkonen players
Kazakhstan Premier League players
Russian expatriate footballers
Expatriate footballers in Finland
Expatriate footballers in Kazakhstan
Russian expatriate sportspeople in Kazakhstan